The St Mungo Museum of Religious Life and Art is a museum of religion in Glasgow, Scotland. It has been described as the only public museum in the world devoted solely to this subject, although other notable museums of this kind are the State Museum of the History of Religion in St. Petersburg and the Catharijneconvent in Utrecht.

Construction and history 

The museum is located in Cathedral Square, on the lands of Glasgow Cathedral at Castle Street. It was constructed in 1989 on the site of a medieval castle-complex, the former residence of the bishops of Glasgow, parts of which can be seen inside the Cathedral and at the People's Palace, Glasgow. The museum building emulates the Scottish Baronial architectural style used for the former bishop's castle.

The museum opened in 1993.

Nearby are the Provand's Lordship (Glasgow's oldest house), the Glasgow Royal Infirmary, and Glasgow Necropolis.

Collection 

The museum houses exhibits relating to all the world's major religions, including a Zen garden and a sculpture showing Islamic calligraphy. It housed Salvador Dalí’s painting Christ of Saint John of the Cross from its opening in 1993 until the reopening of Kelvingrove Art Gallery and Museum in 2006.

Gallery

References

External links 

Museum website
Glasgow Cathedral Precinct—History and original drawings of the Cathedral area.

Christianity in Glasgow
Art museums and galleries in Glasgow
Art museums established in 1993
Religious museums in Scotland
1993 establishments in Scotland